The Otto Warburg Medal is awarded annually by the German Society for Biochemistry and Molecular Biology (German: Gesellschaft für Biochemie und Molekularbiologie or GBM) to honour scientists who have contributed important work in the field of biological chemistry. It is named after Otto Warburg, a renowned German physiologist and Nobel Prize laureate. It was first awarded on his 80th birthday on 8 October 1963.

Up to 2013, nine Warburg Medal recipients have also been awarded the Nobel Prize.

Medallists
Source: GBM

See also
 List of biochemistry awards
 List of biology awards
 List of awards named after people

References

Biology awards
German awards
Awards established in 1963
Biochemistry awards